The sixth season of Fear the Walking Dead, an American horror-drama television series on AMC, premiered on October 11, 2020, and concluded on June 13, 2021, consisting of sixteen episodes. The series is a companion series to The Walking Dead, which is based on the comic book series of the same name by Robert Kirkman, Tony Moore, and Charlie Adlard. The executive producers are Kirkman, David Alpert, Greg Nicotero, Gale Anne Hurd, Scott M. Gimple, Andrew Chambliss, and Ian B. Goldberg, with Chambliss and Goldberg as showrunners for the third consecutive season.

The season follows Morgan Jones (Lennie James) who has been left for dead by Virginia (Colby Minifie), while the remaining members of Morgan's group have been separated by Virginia and her Pioneers and are dispersed across her various settlements. The season also features multiple time jumps.

Cast
The sixth season featured sixteen actors receiving main cast billing status, with eleven returning from the fifth season, while five new cast members are introduced. Christine Evangelista (who was a recurring cast member in The Walking Dead), moved to the main cast after her departure from The Walking Dead. Mo Collins and Colby Hollman were promoted from recurring status and Zoe Colletti and Keith Carradine were added to the main cast.

Main cast

 Lennie James as Morgan Jones: A pragmatic man, formerly a part of Rick Grimes' group on The Walking Dead.
 Alycia Debnam-Carey as Alicia Clark: The fiery yet compassionate daughter of Madison.
 Maggie Grace as Althea "Al" Szewczyk-Przygocki: A curious and tactical journalist.
 Colman Domingo as Victor Strand: A smart and sophisticated conman-turned-businessman, who formed friendships with Madison and Alicia.
 Danay García as Luciana Galvez: A strong and cautious former member of the La Colonia community in Tijuana, Mexico.
 Garret Dillahunt as John Dorie: A lonesome and friendly police officer who is married to June.
 Austin Amelio as Dwight: A reformed former lieutenant of the Saviors, who was exiled from Virginia by Rick Grimes' group on The Walking Dead. He is currently searching for his missing ex-wife Sherry.
 Mo Collins as Sarah Rabinowitz: The adoptive sister of Wendell and a former Marine.
 Alexa Nisenson as Charlie: A young girl who was a spy for the Vultures.
 Karen David as Grace Mukherjee: A woman who used to work at a nuclear power plant that melted down near the site where the plane of Morgan's group crashed.
 Colby Hollman as Wes: A nihilistic painter who allies with Morgan's group.
 Zoe Colletti as Dakota: A member of the Pioneers who is thought to be Virginia's younger sister.
 Jenna Elfman as June Dorie: A kind nurse who is married to John.
 Rubén Blades as Daniel Salazar: A courageous and pragmatic former Sombra Negra member who formed a parental bond with Charlie.
 Christine Evangelista as Sherry: Dwight's long-missing ex-wife who fled across the country to Texas after escaping the Saviors.
 Keith Carradine as John Dorie Sr.: John's father who was also a police officer before the apocalypse.

Supporting cast
 Colby Minifie as Virginia: An antagonistic leader of the Pioneers who at first was thought to be the older sister of Dakota, but was later revealed to actually be her mother.
 Brigitte Kali Canales as Rachel: A pregnant woman who is Isaac's wife.
 Peter Jacobson as Jacob Kessner: A rabbi who joins Morgan's group.
 Holly Curran as Janis: A woman who called Alicia and Strand for help and was saved by Wes. She later joined Morgan's group. She is Tom's sister.
 Craig Nigh as Hill: A high-ranking member of the Pioneers.
 Devyn Tyler as Nora: A woman who is one of the remaining survivors living in an office building where she once worked.
 Daryl Mitchell as Wendell: The adoptive brother of Sarah who uses a wheelchair.
 Cory Hart as Rollie: A former member of Logan's crew, who works with a group of survivors to destroy the Pioneers.
 Justin Smith as Marcus: An arrogant member of the Pioneers.
 John Glover as Theodore "Teddy" Maddox: The leader of the Doomsday cult who intends to exterminate all life on the surface. He is also a serial killer who was hunted down and imprisoned by John Dorie Sr. in the 1970s.
 Nick Stahl as Jason Riley: A high-ranking member of the Doomsday cult who is one of Teddy's devoted followers. Before the apocalypse, he was the weapons officer onboard the USS Pennsylvania.

Guest cast
 Demetrius Grosse as Emile LaRoux: A bounty hunter hired by Virginia to hunt down Morgan.
 Michael Abbott Jr. as Isaac: A desperate survivor who Morgan encountered.
 Damon Carney as Walter: A fugitive who is running from Emile. He is also a former crewmember on the USS Pennsylvania.
 Raphael Sbarge as Ed: A taxidermist who lives in an old hunting lodge.
 Chinaza Uche as Derek: A member of the Doomsday cult and Wes' brother.
 Sahana Srinivasan as Athena Mukherjee: The teenage daughter of Grace.
 Sebastian Sozzi as Cole: A survivor who was once a part of the Dell Diamond Baseball Stadium community and who was believed to have died when it was destroyed.
 Rhoda Griffis as Vivian: Douglas' wife who was once a part of the Dell Diamond Baseball Stadium community and who was believed to have died when it was destroyed.
 Kenneth Wayne Bradley as Douglas: Vivian's husband who was once a part of the Dell Diamond Baseball Stadium community and who was believed to have died when it was destroyed.
 Omid Abtahi as Howard: A former history teacher who Strand met when he was hiding from the nuclear blast.

Episodes

Production
On July 19, 2019, AMC renewed the series for a sixth season.

Casting
In December 2019, it was announced that Zoe Colletti would join the main cast for the sixth season as Dakota, and that Mo Collins and Colby Hollman were promoted to series regulars after having recurring roles since the fourth and fifth seasons, respectively. In January 2020, it was confirmed that Christine Evangelista would reprise her role as Sherry, who last appeared in the seventh season of The Walking Dead; she is the third character to crossover from the parent series to Fear the Walking Dead.

Filming and writing
Production began in November 2019 in Texas. In March 2020, production for the sixth season was shut down due to the COVID-19 pandemic. Prior to the shutdown, the series had almost completed production on the first half of the season and showrunner Andrew Chambliss confirmed that every script for the sixth season was completed. Production was reported to have restarted in late August 2020 and was completed in March 2021.

Showrunner Ian Goldberg stated that the sixth season would take on an "anthology format", where episodes will focus on individual or pairs of characters, similar to previous episodes like season 4's "Laura". Goldberg also described it as "a darker season".

Cast member Lennie James made his directorial debut this season, and was mentored by fellow cast member Colman Domingo who had previously directed episodes for the series; Domingo also directed his third episode of the series in this season.

Reception

Critical response
The sixth season received generally positive reviews, in contrast to generally mixed-to-negative reviews for the previous two seasons. On Rotten Tomatoes, the season has a rating of 89% based on 9 reviews, with an average rating of 7.30/10.

After a mixed-to-negative reception to the fourth and fifth seasons, the series received a renewed positive critical reception during its sixth season, but also received some mixed reviews as the season progressed. Early episodes of the sixth season were praised; Dalton Ross of Entertainment Weekly wrote that the series "is having its best season ever" and was positive about the series' take on different genres, writing "The end result is a bolder, more badass collection of stories that manages to feel narratively cohesive while, at the same time, visually and tonally independent." Paul Tassi of Forbes was positive towards the season and also noted the positive reactions from fans as well. Emily Hannemann of TV Insider also noted the series' improvement over previous seasons and praised the character development, plot and dialogue.

Erik Kain of Forbes at first gave the sixth season positive reviews, but shifted to very negative, stating "the story manages to be so godawful episode after episode."

Ratings

References

External links
 
 

2020 American television seasons
2021 American television seasons
06
Television productions suspended due to the COVID-19 pandemic
Fiction about cults